Nataliya Kozhenova is a Ukrainian actress who has worked in Hindi films. She has done many Hindi movies, and is best known for her movie Anjunaa Beach, in which she was the main protagonist. She encountered some controversy as this movie was based on the infamous Scarlett killing in Goa.

Career 
In 2012, Kozhenova debuted with a leading role in the film Anjunaa Beach. After this, she appeared in movies such as Super Model (2013) and starred in Tere Jism Se Jaan Tak (2015). She has acted in Hindi films Atithi Tum Kab Jaoge?, Super Model, Tere Jism Se Jaan Tak and Bole India Jai Bhim.

Filmography

Films

Web series

References

External links 

Living people
Ukrainian film actresses
Ukrainian expatriates in India
Actresses in Hindi cinema
European actresses in India
Actresses of European descent in Indian films
Place of birth missing (living people)
Year of birth missing (living people)
21st-century Ukrainian actresses